Sidney Arnold Franklin (March 21, 1893 – May 18, 1972) was an American film director and producer. Franklin, like William C. deMille, specialized in adapting literary works or Broadway stage plays.

His brother Chester Franklin (1889–1954) also became a director during the silent film era best known for directing the early Technicolor film The Toll of the Sea.

Partial filmography

Director

Gretchen the Greenhorn (1916) co-directed with brother Chester
A Sister of Six (1916) co-directed with brother Chester
 The Little School Ma'am (1916)
 Jack and the Beanstalk (1917) co-directed with brother Chester
 The Babes in the Woods (1917) co-directed with brother Chester
Treasure Island (1918) co-directed with Chester
The Safety Curtain (1918)
Her Only Way (1918)
The Forbidden City (1918)
The Hoodlum (1919)
A Virtuous Vamp (1919) assistant director with David Kirkland
 Courage (1921)
 Not Guilty (1921)
Smilin' Through (1922)
The Primitive Lover (1922)
Dulcy (1923)
Her Sister from Paris (1925)
Learning to Love (1925)
Beverly of Graustark (1926)
The Actress (1928)
The Last of Mrs. Cheyney (1929)
Wild Orchids (1929)
Devil-May-Care (1929)
A Lady's Morals (1930)
Private Lives (1931)
Smilin' Through (1932)
The Barretts of Wimpole Street (1934)
The Barretts of Wimpole Street (1957; a scene-for-scene remake of the 1934 version)
The Dark Angel (1935)
The Good Earth (1937) - nominated for Academy Award for Best Director
Duel in the Sun (1946), uncredited

Producer

Ninotchka (1939) (associate producer)
Waterloo Bridge (1940)
Mrs. Miniver (1942)
Random Harvest (1942)
Bambi (1942; animated by Walt Disney Productions while Franklin served as creative consultant)
Madame Curie (1943)
The White Cliffs of Dover (1944)
The Yearling (1946)
Homecoming (1948)
Command Decision (1948)
The Miniver Story (1950)
Fearless Fagan (1952) (associate producer)
Sky Full of Moon (1952)
The Story of Three Loves (1953)
Gypsy Colt (1953)
Young Bess (1953)
Torch Song (1953)

Actor
A Rogue's Romance (1919) - Burgomaster
The Man in the Moonlight (1919) - Pierre Delorme
Down Home (1920) - Cash Bailey
The Blue Moon (1920) - Louie Solomon
 Fashion Row (1923)
Ben-Hur (1925) - Chariot Race Spectator (uncredited)
Mrs. Miniver (1942) - Man at Flower Show (uncredited) (final film role)

References

External links

 
Sidney Franklin; AllMovie.com bio

1893 births
1972 deaths
Burials at Hollywood Forever Cemetery
Film directors from San Francisco

American people of German descent